Furcifer is a genus of chameleons whose member species are mostly endemic to Madagascar, but F. cephalolepis and F. polleni are endemic to the Comoros. Additionally, F. pardalis has been introduced to Réunion and Mauritius, while F. oustaleti has been introduced to near Nairobi in Kenya.

Taxonomy
The generic name is derived from the Latin root  meaning "forked" and refers to the shape of the animal's feet.

The genus contains 24 species.

Species
The following species are recognized as being valid.
 

Nota bene: A binomial authority in parentheses indicates that the species was originally described in a genus other than Furcifer.

References

Further reading
Fitzinger L. 1843. Systema Reptilium, Fasciculus Primus, Amblyglossae. Vienna: Braumüller & Seidel. 106 pp. + indices. (Furcifer, new genus, p. 42). (in Latin).
 
 
 Anderson CV. (2006). Captive Chameleon Populations. Accessed 23-01-2009

 
Lizard genera
Lizards of Africa
Taxa named by Leopold Fitzinger